Drummonds may refer to:

 Drummonds Bank, an English private banking house
 Drummonds (TV series), a British television drama series produced for London Weekend Television